Yuri Gagarin Stadium was a multi-purpose stadium in Varna, Bulgaria. It was initially used as the stadium of Cherno More Varna and Spartak Varna. It was named after Soviet cosmonaut Yuri Gagarin. It will be replaced with a new stadium that was due to open in 2018, but is currently on hold.  The capacity of the stadium was 40,000 spectators. The stadium was demolished in 2007.

External links
 Stadium history
 Stadium picture

Buildings and structures demolished in 2008
Defunct football venues in Bulgaria
Multi-purpose stadiums in Bulgaria
Sports venues in Varna, Bulgaria